From 1931 Granada CF has played in the following levels of Spanish football:
26 seasons in La Liga
31 seasons in Segunda División
22 seasons in Segunda División B
5 seasons in Tercera División (third level before 1977–78)
2 seasons in Regional

Key

Key to league record:
Pld = Matches played
W = Matches won
D = Matches drawn
L = Matches lost
GF = Goals for
GA = Goals against
Pts = Points
Pos = Final position

Key to divisions:
2ª = Segunda División
2ªB = Segunda División B
3ª = Tercera División
2Reg = Segunda Regional
3Reg = Tercera Regional

Key to rounds:
W = Winners
RU = Runners-up
SF = Semi-finals
QF = Quarter-finals
R16 = Round of 16
R32 = Round of 32

R3 = Third round
R2 = Second round
R1 = First round
PR = Preliminary round

Seasons

1 Only league goals included

References

External links
History of Granada CF season to season 

 
Granada
Association football lists by Spanish club